The following is an episode list for Unsung, a TV One biography and documentary television series about R&B, soul, jazz, gospel, blues, rap and reggae recording artists from the 1960s through the early 2000s. As of January 2022, 170 episodes have aired across 15 seasons.

List of episodes

Season 1

Season 2

Season 3

Season 4

Season 5

Season 6

Season 7

Season 8

Season 9

Season 10

Season 11

Season 12

Season 13

Season 14

Season 15

References 

Kool Moe Dee on Hip-Hop: "Nobody Lived It Like We Did" | Loop21
Unsung
Breaking News - TV One Renews Award Winning Docu-Series "Unsung" for a Sixth Season | TheFutonCritic.com

External links 
 Phyllis Hyman episode at IMDb
 The Clark Sisters episode at IMDb
 Donny Hathaway at IMDb
 The DeBarge Family episode at IMDb
 Minnie Riperton episode at IMDb
 Melba Moore episode at IMDb
 Shalamar episode at IMDb
 Florence Ballard episode at IMDb

Lists of American non-fiction television series episodes